From List of National Natural Landmarks, these are the National Natural Landmarks in Minnesota.  There are 8 in total.

Minnesota
National Natural Landmarks